The Oslo Port Line is an abandoned Norwegian railway that went between the two main railway stations in Oslo, Oslo Østbanestasjon and Oslo Vestbanestasjon.

The line enabled trains to travel between the two train stations, but the line was located in the streets, making it a delicate task and stopping traffic in the City Hall Square, the plaza in front of Oslo City Hall. The railway also connected to the port in Oslo, and using the new line it was possible to transfer cargo directly from the railway to ships. Only a few freight trains per day used the line and no passenger trains. Passengers who wanted to transfer between the two stations had to find alternate means of transportation. The line was opened on 13 November 1907, but closed in 1983, after the Oslo Tunnel between Skøyen and the new Oslo Central Station was opened in 1980.

References 

Railway lines in Norway
Railway lines in Oslo
Railway lines opened in 1907
1907 establishments in Norway
Closed railway lines
Street running